Walidpur  is a village in Meerut district in the Indian state of Uttar Pradesh.

Walidpur is a village in Mau district, Uttar Pradesh, India, and had a population of around 26500 in the 2011 census. Walidpur has a mixed community, with 60% Muslims and 40% Hindus.

History 

The village is approximately 600 years old Walidpur is an Indian village located in Muhammadabad Gohna Tehsil Mau district of Uttar Pradesh.

As per Census 2011 information, the village code of Walidpur village is 197677. The name of the first person who came to Walidpur as a jageerdar nearly 600 years was Shah Bandagi Maroof. It is a historical village. There are various great personalities belong to this village. Now, the Village has been developed into a Qasba (Town Area) and has many facilities as compared to some 20 years back. The Maqbara of Maulana Kamil Saheb and Sufi Jan Saheb are built have here which accompanied with their ancestral house. The annual Urs celebrations held here. Shah mohd Izhar Ahmad is the sajjadah nashin of Dargah of maulana kamil sahab &Sufi sahab and the first chairman of walidpur Shameema Ali W/o Mohd Ali got opportunity to become 1st chairman in the history of Walidpur.

Geography 
Walidpur is a city in the eastern part of the state of Uttar Pradesh in India.

It is located at 26°07′N 83°32′E / 26.11°N 83.54°E / 26.11; 83.54, and has an average elevation of 68 metres (223 feet). Ghosi is situated at plain 'Maidani Area' Tons and Tamsa rivers.

Admiration 
Till today Walidpur has elected total any CPardhan and their present (2017–22) chairman is a Women Shamima Ali w/o Muhammad Ali.

Education 
In the 2011 census there were 10,558 people who were illiterate.

Up to Higher Secondary & local schools 
B.R.K Iter College Walidpur, Primary School Kodra

Primary Schools
Mathiya, Primary School Qazitola, Primary School Sir Suleman Bhira, IESDUTT Inter College, B.M.D Inter College, Syyeda Modren Public School. BSRK Inter College Ramnagr Khalisa

Degree colleges
Arjun Girls Degree College Walidpur

Madrassas
Walidpur has a larger number of Madarsa Of Madrasa Nurul Islam  (Arabic College) was established in 1909 by the supreme ulamas at that time. Other madrasas include Madrasa Rehmaniya, Madrsa Rauzatul Uloom, Madrasa Mansorool Uloom, Madrsa Rehimiya. Other important religious institutes are Madrsa Azizya Khirul Uloom, madrsa husainia, Madarsa Kamiliya Anwarool Uloom, Madrasa Talimulquran.

Girls' institutes 
Madarsa Nurul Islam (Niswan), Arjun Girls Degree College etc education.

Economy 

Out of the total population, 12,387 were engaged in work or business activity. Of this 5,850 were males while 3,537 were females. In census survey, worker is defined as person who does business, job, service, and cultivator and labour activity. Of total 12,387 working population, 86.62% were engaged in Main Work while 13.38% of total workers were engaged in Marginal Work.

Walidpur is a major place which is known for weaving and this is the main source of income of the town. The people of Ghosi weaving Saari and other clothes on Powerlooms or Handlooms day and night. Powerlooms were the lifeline of Ghosi's economy but nowadays people have chosen other sources of income like working in abroad countries, at the present time many people use to go to Gulf countries to earn money.

Climate 
Climate of the region is not so comfortable for people because in rainy season having heavy rain, in Winter extreme cold and in summer heated hot, but the climate is good for crops exceptions in only some periods, when rain needed for crops there is no rain and when rain is not necessary there is heavy rain, extreme cold also harm crops.

Area 

Walidpur covers 4 to 5 square kilometer area in this town there are so many localities, Ramnagar, Kodra, Paraskhad, Nayapura, Mathiay, Khiriya, Kuttubpur, Bhira, Bichalapura, Islampura, Uttar Muhalla, Deeh, Bhitti, Naibasti, Kazitola , Eidgah, Naraper, Darwa, etc are the localities also.

Sport 

Football, Cricket and Kabaddi are most preferred games in Walid pur. Badminton Volleyball and other new games are becoming common among the new generations. All locality had their own games team in all formats and they have their own home grounds too Apne Yaar Club B.R.K Inter College Ground, Yound muslim Sporting Club, Nomani Cricket Club, Azad Cricket Club, Crant, Young Seraj , Dildar Sporting  Club, etc. Walid Pur had many play grounds like B.R.k Inter College Ground, Madarsa Nurul Islam , Nadi Ground, Bhira Ground etc.

Architecture 

A gate of Imam Bargah Walidpur

Its architecture includes the Jama Masjid Husainia, which is the oldest monument of Walidpur was made before independence. It is of very similar construction to the Jma Masjid Siddique Akabr  of Walidpur. The Sadar Imam Baargaah of Walidpur is notable example of architecture of Azadari in India. The tomb of the Sufi saint Muhammad Siddique Jaan is located behind Kazitola; the tombo Maulana Kami Sahab is located at Kazitola, The tombo Lal Chiraiya Baba Dargah Nayapura, etc..

Culture 

A symbol of Peace Taaziyah, Idol of Goddess Durga, Masjid Husaina Walidpur,, Mau

Here on year in district of from all big urs of fair sounds is maulana kamil sir and muhammad famous sufi life sir of tomb on the on country of corner corner from heavy number in people view coming is

Muslims (both Shia and Sunni) and Hindus, celebrate their religious events. Durga Puja, Divali, Muharram, Eid e Miladun Nabi (S.A.), Ramadhan, and Eid are main religious events. Some time Mushaairah also organized by the people of Ghosi.and jooluse mohammadi (بارہ ربیع الاول) Jashne-Eid-Miladun Nabi.

Transport 
By Road

Walidpur is located on Muhammadabad Ghosi Road and well connected to all Poorvanchal Express 3KM the cities ang Lucknow and Kanpur.

Walidpur Station

By Air

The nearest International airport is Lal Bahadur Shastri International airport Babatpur Varanasi located at the Babatpur outside area of Varanasi city, distance Between Ghosi to Lal Bahadur Shastri International Airport is - 110 km (93.00 miles). Nearest airport to Ghosi Ghosi‘s nearest airport is Azamgarh Airport situated at 36.0 km distance. Few more airports around Ghosi are as follows. Azamgarh Airport	36.0 km. Ghazipur Airport	55.9 km. Gorakhpur Airport	90.4 km.

By Rail

Walidpuri does have a railway station itself. The nearest Broad Gauge railway station from Walidpur is Muhammadabad Railway station which is located in and around 6.3 kilometer distance. The following table shows other railway stations and its distance from Mamakudi. Indara Jn railway station	38.3 km. Mau Jn railway station	26.1 km. Muhammadabad railway station	5.2 km.. Sathiaon railway station	22.0 km.

Politics 
Ghosi Lok Sabha constituency (Hindi: घोसी लोक सभा निर्वाचन क्षेत्र) is one of the 80 Lok Sabha (parliamentary) constituencies in Uttar Pradesh state. Muhammadabad is  a Vidhan Sabha (legislative assembly) seat in Uttar Pradesh. Ghosi is also a Nagar Panchayat which is near to become Nagar Palika in future, it has 16 wards and these have Ward Members for the development of area and public works

Demographics 

Overview Walidpur

Walidpur is a Nagar Panchayat city in district of Mau, Uttar Pradesh. The Ghosi city is divided into 16 wards for which elections are held every 5 years. The Ghosi Nagar Panchayat has population of 19,165 of which 10,135 are males while 9,030 are females as per report released by Census India 2011.

Population of Children with age of 0-6 is 5934 which is 15.15% of total population of Walidpur (NP). In Ghosi Nagar Panchayat, Female Sex Ratio is of 945 against state average of 912. Moreover, Child Sex Ratio in Ghosi is around 955 compared to Uttar Pradesh state average of 902. Literacy rate of Ghosi city is 77.65% higher than state average of 67.68%. In Ghosi, Male literacy is around 83.40% while female literacy rate is 71.55%.

Ghosi Nagar Panchayat has total administration over 4,170 houses to which it supplies basic amenities like water and sewerage. It is also authorized to build roads within Nagar Panchayat limits and impose taxes on properties coming under its jurisdiction.

Religion Percent

Islam 58.05
Hinduism 41.33
Christianity 0.19
Buddhism 0.03
Jainism 0.02

Languages of Ghosi

The native language of Walidpur is Hindi, Urdu and most of the village people speak Hindi, Urdu. Ghosi people use Hindi, Urdu language for communication.

References

Cities and towns in Meerut district